Nicolau is a Portuguese and Catalan given name, a variant of Nicholas. People known by this name include:

Nicolau Coelho, Portuguese explorer
Nicolau dos Reis Lobato, East-Timorese politician and national hero
Nicolau Tolentino de Almeida, the foremost Portuguese satirical poet of the 18th century

See also

Nicola (name)
Nicolae (name)
Nicolai (given name)
Nicolaj
Nicolao
Nicolas (given name)
Nicolau (surname)
Nicolay
São Nicolau (disambiguation)

Portuguese masculine given names